Surat Urban Development Authority is the urban planning agency of Surat, India. It is also known as Surat Metropolitan Region or Surat Metropolitan Area. SUDA was formed on 31st January 1978, under Gujarat Town Planning and Urban Development Act - 1976, with the jurisdiction area of 722 sq.km which covers SMC (Surat Municipal Corporation) and 195 villages surrounding SMC.

References

External links
 

Government of Surat
State urban development authorities of India
Local government in Gujarat
State agencies of Gujarat
1976 establishments in Gujarat
Government agencies established in 1976
Economy of Surat